The Department of Industry, Innovation, Climate Change, Science, Research and Tertiary Education (DIICSRTE) was a department of the Australian Government charged with further developing growth in Australian industries and advancements in science and research.

History

The department was established on 25 March 2013, taking on functions of the previous Department of Climate Change and Energy Efficiency and the Department of Industry, Innovation, Science, Research and Tertiary Education.

It was abolished less than six months later on 18 September 2013 by the newly elected Abbott Government. Its functions were principally transferred to the Department of Industry; with its environmental functions transferred to the Department of the Environment.

Discussing the Department's lengthy name in 2014, former Secretary Don Russell told media:

Scope

The department was responsible for:

 Manufacturing and commerce including industry and market development
 Industry innovation policy and technology diffusion
 Promotion of industrial research and development, and commercialisation
 Biotechnology, excluding gene technology regulation
 Export services
 Marketing, including export promotion, of manufactures and services
 Investment promotion
 Enterprise improvement
 Construction industry
 Small business policy and implementation
 Business entry point management
 Facilitation of the development of service industries generally
 Bounties on the production of goods
 Trade marks, plant breeders’ rights and patents of inventions and designs
 Country of origin labelling
 Weights and measures standards
 Civil space issues
 Analytical laboratory services
 Science policy
 Promotion of collaborative research in science and technology
 Co-ordination of research policy
 Commercialisation and utilisation of public sector research relating to portfolio programs and agencies
 Research grants and fellowships
 Information and communications technology industry development

The Department was made up of several divisions including Innovation, Manufacturing, Science & Research, Corporate, Industry & Small Business Policy, eBusiness and Questacon. The Enterprise Connect and AusIndustry divisions served as the program delivery arms of the Department.

References

Industry, Innovation, Science, Research and Tertiary Education
2013 disestablishments in Australia
2013 establishments in Australia
Australia, Industry, Innovation, Science, Research and Tertiary Education